Jun-seok, also spelled Joon-seok or Joon-suk, is a Korean masculine given name. Its meaning differs based on the hanja used to write each syllable of the name. There are 34 hanja with the reading "jun" and 20 hanja with the reading "seok" on the South Korean government's official list of hanja which may be registered for use in given names.

People with this name include:
Choi Joon-suk (born 1983), South Korean baseball player
Song Joon-seok (born 1968), South Korean voice actor
Bang Jun-seok (born 1970), South Korean film score composer
Lee Jun-seok (born 1985), South Korean entrepreneur and Bareun Party politician
Yeon Joon-seok (born 1995), South Korean actor
Hwang Jun-seok, South Korean professor of engineering at Seoul National University

See also
List of Korean given names

References

Korean masculine given names